Now Bahar (also Romanized as Now Bahār; also known as Nowbahar Hoomeh) is a village in Qasemabad Rural District, in the Central District of Rafsanjan County, Kerman Province, Iran. At the 2006 census, its population was 59, in 9 families.

References 

Populated places in Rafsanjan County